Edward Irving (4 August 17927 December 1834) was a Scottish clergyman, generally regarded as the main figure behind the foundation of the Catholic Apostolic Church.

Early life
Edward Irving was born at Annan, Annandale the second son of Gavin Irving, a tanner, and his wife, Mary Lowther of Dornock. On his father's side, who followed the occupation of a tanner, he was descended from a family long known in the district which had ties to French Huguenot refugees. His mother's side, the Lowthers, were farmers or small proprietors in Annandale. The first stage of his education was passed at a school kept by Peggy Paine, a relation of Thomas Paine, after which he entered the Annan Academy taught by Adam Hope.

Scotland
At the age of thirteen he entered the University of Edinburgh. In 1809 he graduated M.A.; and in 1810, on the recommendation of Sir John Leslie, he was chosen master of the mathematical school, newly established at Haddington, East Lothian. Amongst his pupils there were Jane Welsh, afterwards famous as Mrs Carlyle, one of the great letter-writers of the nineteenth century, and Thomas Burns.

He became engaged in 1812 to Isabella Martin, but he gradually fell in love with Jane Welsh, and she with him. He tried to get out of his engagement with Isabella, but was prevented by her family. It was Irving, ironically, who in 1821 had introduced Thomas Carlyle, the essayist, to her. Eventually, in 1823, he married Isabella. (Confusingly, Irving was also influential in the life of another Scottish Thomas Carlyle, born a few years later, whom he eventually gave a position of some responsibility within his new church.)

His appointment at Haddington was exchanged for a similar one at Kirkcaldy Academy in Fife, in 1812. Completing his divinity studies by a series of partial sessions, he was licensed to preach in June 1815, but continued to discharge his scholastic duties for three years. He devoted his leisure, not only to mathematical and physical science, but to a course of reading in English literature, his bias towards the antique in sentiment and style being strengthened by a perusal of the older classics, among whom Richard Hooker was his favorite author. At the same time his love of the marvellous found gratification in the wonders of the Arabian Nights, and it is further characteristically related of him that he used to carry continually in his waistcoat pocket a miniature copy of Ossian, passages from which he frequently recited with sonorous elocution and vehement gesticulation.

In the summer of 1818, he resigned his mastership and, in order to increase the probability of obtaining a permanent appointment in the Church of Scotland, took up his residence in Edinburgh. Although his exceptional method of address seems to have gained him the qualified approval of certain dignitaries of the church, the prospect of his obtaining a settled charge seemed as remote as ever. He was meditating a missionary tour in Persia when his departure was arrested by steps taken by Thomas Chalmers which, after considerable delay, resulted in October 1819 in Irving being appointed his assistant and missionary in St John's parish, Glasgow.

Except in the case of a select few, Irving's preaching awakened little interest among the congregation of St John's. Chalmers himself, with no partiality for its bravuras and flourishes, compared it to Italian music, appreciated only by connoisseurs; but as a missionary among the poorer classes he wielded a powerful influence. The benediction "Peace be to this house", with which, in accordance with apostolic usage, he greeted every dwelling he entered, was not inappropriate to his figure and aspect, and it is said he took the people's attention wonderfully, the more especially after the magic of his personality found opportunity to reveal itself in close and homely intercourse.

London

This half-success in a subordinate sphere was, however, so far from coinciding with his aspirations that he had again, in the winter of 1821, begun to turn his attention towards missionary labour in the East, when the possibility of fulfilling the dream of his life was suddenly revealed to him by an invitation from the Caledonian Church, Hatton Garden, London (now the Lumen Church, Bloomsbury), to make trial and proof of his gifts before the remnant of the congregation that held together.

Over that charge, he was ordained in July 1822. Some years previously, he had expressed his conviction that one of the chief needs of the age was to make inroad after the alien, to bring in the votaries of fashion, of literature, of sentiment, of policy and of rank, who are content in their several idolatries to do without piety to God and love to Him whom He hath sent; and, with an abruptness which must have produced on him at first an effect almost astounding, he now had the satisfaction of beholding these various votaries thronging to hear from his lips the words of wisdom which would deliver them from their several idolatries and remodel their lives according to the fashion of apostolic times.

This sudden leap into popularity seems to have been occasioned in connection with a veiled allusion to Irving's striking eloquence made in the House of Commons by George Canning, who had been induced to attend his church from admiration of an expression in one of his prayers, quoted to him by Sir James Mackintosh. "His commanding stature, the symmetry of his form, the dark and melancholy beauty of his countenance, rather rendered piquant than impaired by an obliquity of vision, produced an imposing impression even before his deep and powerful voice had given utterance to its melodious thunders; and harsh and superficial half-truths enunciated with surpassing ease and grace of gesture, and not only with an air of absolute conviction but also with the authority of a prophetic messenger, in tones whose magical fascination was inspired by an earnestness beyond all imitation of art, acquired a plausibility and importance which, at least while the orator spoke, made his audience entirely forgetful of their preconceived objections against them. The subject-matter of his orations, and his peculiar treatment of his themes, no doubt also, at least at first, constituted a considerable part of his attractive influence."

He had specially prepared himself, as he thought, for teaching imaginative men, and political men, and legal men, and scientific men who bear the world in hand; and he did not attempt to win their attention to abstract and worn-out theological arguments, but discussed the opinions, the poetry, the politics, the manners and customs of the time, and this not with philosophical comprehensiveness, not in terms of warm eulogy or measured blame, but of severe satire varied by fierce denunciation, and with a specific minuteness which was concerned primarily with individuals.

A fire of criticism from pamphlets, newspapers and reviews opened on his volume of Orations, published in 1823; but the excitement produced was merely superficial and essentially evanescent. Though cherishing a strong antipathy to the received ecclesiastical formulas, Irving's great aim was to revive the antique style of thought and sentiment which had hardened into these formulas, and by this means to supplant the new influences, the accidental and temporary moral shortcomings of which he detected with instinctive certainty, but whose profound and real tendencies were utterly beyond the reach of his conjecture.

Being thus radically at variance with the main current of the thought of his time, the failure of the commission he had undertaken was sooner or later inevitable; and shortly after the opening of his new church in Regent Square in 1827, he found that fashion had taken its departure, and the church, though always well filled, was no longer crowded. By this desertion his self-esteem, one of his strongest passions, though curiously united with singular sincerity and humility, was doubtless hurt to the quick; but the wound inflicted was of a deeper and deadlier kind, for it confirmed him finally in his despair of the world's gradual amelioration, and established his tendency towards supernaturalism.

Forerunner of the Catholic Apostolic Church
For years the subject of prophecy had occupied much of Irving's thoughts, and his belief in the near approach of the second advent had received such positive corroboration by the perusal of the work of a Jesuit priest, Manuel Lacunza, writing under the assumed Jewish name of "Juan Josafat Ben-Ezra", that in 1827 he published a translation of it, accompanied with an eloquent preface. Probably the religious opinions of Irving, originally in some respects more catholic and truer to human nature than generally prevailed in ecclesiastical circles, had gained breadth and comprehensiveness from his intercourse with Samuel Taylor Coleridge but gradually his chief interest in Coleridge's philosophy centred round what was mystical and obscure, and to it in all likelihood may be traced his initiation into the doctrine of millenarianism.

The first stage of his later development which resulted in the establishment of the Irvingite or Holy Catholic Apostolic Church in 1832 was associated with the Albury Conferences (1826–30), moderated by Hugh Boyd M‘Neile (1795–1879), at his friend Henry Drummond's seat, Albury Park at Albury, Surrey concerning unfulfilled prophecy, followed by an almost exclusive study of the prophetical books and especially of the Apocalypse, and by several series of sermons on prophecy both in London and the provinces. His apocalyptic lectures in 1828 crowding the largest churches of Edinburgh on summer mornings.

In 1830, however, there was opened up to his ardent imagination a new vista of things spiritual, a new hope for the age in which he lived, by the revival in a remote corner of Scotland of those apostolic gifts of prophecy and healing which he had already in 1828 persuaded himself had only been kept in abeyance by the absence of faith.

At once, he welcomed the new powers with an unquestioning evidence that could be shaken by neither the remonstrances nor the desertions of his dearest friends, the recantation of some of the principal agents of the gifts, his own descent into a subordinate position, the meagre and barren results of the manifestations, nor their general rejection both by the church and the world. His excommunication by the Presbytery of London in 1830 for publishing his doctrines of the humanity of Jesus Christ, and the condemnation of these opinions by the General Assembly of the Church of Scotland in the following year, were secondary episodes that only affected the main issue of his career insofar as they further isolated him from the sympathy of the church; but the irregularities connected with the manifestation of the gifts gradually estranged the majority of his own congregation, and on the complaint of the trustees to the Presbytery of London, whose authority they had formerly rejected, he was declared unfit to remain the minister of the National Scotch Church of Regent Square.

After he and those who adhered to him (describing themselves as of the Holy Catholic Apostolic Church) had in 1832 removed to a new building in Newman Street, he was, in March 1833, deposed from the ministry of the Church of Scotland by the Presbytery of Annan on the original charge of heresy.

Having been expelled from the Church of Scotland, Irving took to preaching in the open air in Islington, until a new church was built for him and his followers in Duncan Street, Islington. It was funded by Duncan Mackenzie of Barnsbury, a former elder of Irving's London church, and built by the Holborn firm of Stevenson & Ramage. It closed in the 1970s.

With the sanction of the power, he was now, after some delay, reordained chief pastor of the church assembled in Newman Street, but unremitting labours and ceaseless spiritual excitement soon completely exhausted the springs of his vital energy. He died, worn out and wasted with labour and absorbing care while still in the prime of life, 7 December 1834. He is buried in the crypt of Glasgow Cathedral near to the tomb of St. Mungo.

Monument

There is a statue of Irving in the grounds of Annan Old Parish Church in Dumfriesshire. It was sculpted by J. W. Dods of Dumfries. It was unveiled by Archibald Charteris in 1892 on the centenary of Irving's birth.

Family

In October 1823 he married Isobel Martin, daughter of Rev Dr John Martin DD of Kirkcaldy. They has at least eight children the first for of which died in infancy. Surviving children included Isabella Irving (b.1834) who married Samuel Rawson Gardiner and Martin Howy Irving who moved to Australia.

Bibliography
The writings of Irving published during his lifetime were:
For the Oracles of God, Four Orations (1823)
For Judgment to come (1823)
Babylon and Infidelity foredoomed - A Discourse on the Prophecies of Daniel and the Apocalypse which relate to these latter times, and until the Second Advent (1826, 2nd ed. 1828)
Sermons, etc. (3 vols, 1828)
Exposition of the Book of Revelation (1831)
an introduction to The Coming of Messiah in Glory and Majesty, a translation of Manuel Lacunza's book
an introduction to Horne's Commentary on the Psalms.
His collected works were published in 5 volumes, edited by Gavin Carlyle. The Life of Edward Irving, by Mrs Oliphant, appeared in 1862 in 2 vols. Among a large number of biographies published previously, that by Washington Wilks (1854) has some merit. See also Hazlitt's Spirit of the Age; Coleridge's Notes on English Divines; Carlyle's Miscellanies, and Carlyle's Reminiscences, vol. 1. (1881).

References

Attribution:

Further reading
 Andrew Landale Drummond, Edward Irving and His Circle: Including Some Consideration of the 'Tongues' Movement in the Light of Modern Psychology. 1937. Reprinted, Eugene, OR: Wipf & Stock, 2009. . (305pp).
 Gordon Strachan, The Pentecostal Theology of Edward Irving; London, 1973.
 Dallimore, Arnold, The Life of Edward Irving, the Fore-runner of the Charismatic Movement, Edinburgh, The Banner of Truth Trust, 1983. , (188pp).
 Stunt, Timothy C.F., From Awakening to Secession, Radical Evangelicals in Switzerland and Britain 1815-35, Edinburgh, T & T Clark, 2000. , (402pp).
 Warfield, B. B., Counterfeit Miracles, Banner of Truth, 1996. . Note: this book is not exclusively about Edward Irving, but discusses him and his ministry critically.
 Warfield, B.B.,

External links

Significant Scots - Edward Irving
Collected Works of Edward Irving Edited by Gavin Carlyle Vol 2, Vol 3 &  Vols 1 to 5 - (free download)
Taking Irving to Task About His Reports of Speaking in Tongues by William Goode, Christian Heritage Center, 2007
The Life of Edward Irving by Margaret Oliphant  Vol 1 &   Vol 2
The Orthodox and Catholic Doctrine Of Our Lord’s Human Nature by Edward Irving
The Revelation of Jesus Christ (in 15 books) by Edward Irving. Reformatted with smaller paragraphs, subheadings, and linked Contents (free download)

1792 births
1834 deaths
Scottish Christian theologians
Irvingites
 
Scottish schoolteachers
Alumni of the University of Edinburgh
Church of Scotland
People from Annan, Dumfries and Galloway
People educated at Annan Academy